D. Frangopoulos (Greek: Δ. Φραγκόπουλος) was a Greek tennis player.  He competed at the 1896 Summer Olympics in Athens.

Frangopoulos was defeated in the first round of the singles tournament by Momcsilló Tapavicza of Hungary.  This put him in a six-way tie for eighth place in the field of thirteen players.  He did not compete in the doubles tournament.

References

Greek male tennis players
Olympic tennis players of Greece
Tennis players at the 1896 Summer Olympics
19th-century male tennis players
Year of birth missing
Year of death missing
Place of birth missing
Place of death missing